Olympe is an ancient Greek city in the region of Epirus. Its location is probably at modern Mavrovë.

Olympe may also refer to:
Olympe (singer), French singer famous after coming runner-up in season 2 of French The Voice: la plus belle voix
Olympe de Gouges (1748–1793), born Marie Gouze, French playwright and political activist with feminist and abolitionist writings 
Olympe Aguado (1827–1894), Franco-Spanish photographer and socialite
Olympe Audouard (1832–1890), French feminist 
Olympe Bhêly-Quénum (born 1928), Beninese writer, journalist and magazine editor
Olympe Bradna (1920–2012), French dancer and actress
Olympe Pélissier (1799-1878), French artists' model and the second wife of the Italian composer Gioachino Rossini

Fictional characters 

Olympe Maxime, headmistress of Beauxbatons, the French wizarding school in Harry Potter

See also
Olympia (disambiguation)
Olympus (disambiguation)
Cyprienne Dubernet (aka Madame Olympe Hériot and later Mrs Roger Douine) (1857–1945), French patron and philanthropist 
Olympia Mancini (in French Olympe Mancini) (1638-1708), Countess of Soissons and one of the celebrated Mancini sisters, known as the Mazarinettes 
Olympe-Philippe Gerbet (1798-1864), French Catholic bishop and writer